Markus Lanz (born 16 March 1969) is a German-Italian television presenter based in Germany.

Early life 
Lanz is a member of the German-speaking majority in the Italian province of South Tyrol. He grew up in Geiselsberg, a village located 1,344 metres above sea level in the central Alps. Lanz stated that his family was poor, and that his father died at an early age, leaving his mother to care for three children. His good school grades earned him a scholarship to the monastery of Neustift, where he went to private Catholic secondary school. He finished high school at the Humanistisches Gymnasium in Bruneck in 1988 and completed military service as a radio operator in the alpine division of the Italian army before working at the radio station Radio Holiday. In 1992, Lanz completed a vocational training course in communications at the Bayerische Akademie für Werbung und Marketing.

Career 

In 1992, Lanz started a two-year trainee program at Radio Hamburg in Hamburg. In 1995, he became the news announcer at the regional TV station RTL North, and in 1997, started as presenter of a regional evening news show in Schleswig-Holstein.

Since 2008, Lanz has hosted the weekly cooking show Lanz kocht!

Since October 2009, he has hosted the talk show Markus Lanz three evenings a week.

Between October 2012 and 2014, he presented the monthly German TV show Wetten, dass..? as successor to Thomas Gottschalk.

Private life 
Lanz plays the piano and founded the band "W5" in which he played with his brother. He has a son (born 2000) from a previous relationship with TV presenter Birgit Schrowange. In July 2011, Lanz married Angela Gessmann.
Lanz is a Roman-Catholic.

Books

References

External links 

 
 Markus Lanz at RTL
 Lanz kocht official website (archived)
 Markus Lanz at ZDF

Italian television presenters
German television presenters
Italian Roman Catholics
German Roman Catholics
Living people
Germanophone Italian people
People from Bruneck
1969 births
ZDF people
German television talk show hosts